The Alvar-e Garmsiri District is a district (bakhsh) in Andimeshk County, Khuzestan Province, Iran. At the 2006 census, its population was 19,165, in 3,838 families.  The District has one city: Hoseyniyeh. The District has three rural districts (dehestan): Hoseyniyeh Rural District, Mazu Rural District, and Qilab Rural District.

References 

Andimeshk County

Districts of Khuzestan Province